Fogo Aerodrome  is a local airport located  south of Fogo, Newfoundland and Labrador, Canada on Fogo Island. It is the island's only infrastructure for air transport.

Scheduled service from Fogo is provided by Exploits Valley Air Services on a thrice weekly flight to Gander using a DHC-6 Twin Otter and a direct service to Halifax using a Beechcraft 1900.

Airlines and destinations

References

Registered aerodromes in Newfoundland and Labrador